Raymond Cabal (16 January 1888 – 23 October 1969) was a French wrestler. He competed in the lightweight event at the 1912 Summer Olympics.

References

External links
 

1888 births
1969 deaths
Olympic wrestlers of France
Wrestlers at the 1912 Summer Olympics
French male sport wrestlers
Sportspeople from Bordeaux